The 1998 American League Championship Series (ALCS), the second round of the 1998 American League playoffs, was played between the East Division champion New York Yankees and the Central Division champion Cleveland Indians.

The Yankees defeated the Indians four games to two and went on to sweep the National League champion San Diego Padres in the 1998 World Series to win their 24th World Series championship. New York, who won 114 games during the regular season, recorded their only two losses of the 1998 postseason in this series.

Background
Cleveland advanced to the ALCS by ousting the Wild Card Boston Red Sox three games to one in the AL Division Series, while New York swept the West Division champion Texas Rangers three games to none.

This was the second consecutive year in which the Yankees and Indians met in the postseason. The Indians won the 1997 ALDS over the Yankees in five games.

Summary

New York Yankees vs. Cleveland Indians

Game summaries

Game 1
Tuesday, October 6, 1998, at Yankee Stadium (I) in Bronx, New York

Cleveland came in as heavy underdogs, but also were the defending American League Champions. In Game 1, the Yankees got off to a good start, by hitting four straight singles in the bottom of the first to score two runs. A groundout and stolen base then put runners on second and third with two outs before a wild pitch to Shane Spencer scored another run. Spencer walked before Jorge Posada's RBI single made it 4–0 Yankees and knocked starter Jaret Wright out of the game. Chad Ogea came on in relief and allowed an RBI single to Scott Brosius. Posada's leadoff home run in the sixth off of Ogea made it 6–0, then next inning, back-to-back leadoff doubles by Paul O'Neill and Bernie Williams made it 7–0. Eventual ALCS MVP David Wells cruised through  innings. A two-run homer by Manny Ramírez would knock home the only runs of the game for Cleveland in the ninth. Jeff Nelson retired the last two batters of the game.

Game 2
Wednesday, October 7, 1998, at Yankee Stadium (I) in Bronx, New York

In Game 2, 20-game winner David Cone went for the Yankees, who looked like they would go to Cleveland up two games in the series. However, David Justice hit a home run in the fourth, putting the Yankees behind for the first time in the postseason. A Scott Brosius double with two on off of Charles Nagy tied the game in the seventh, but the Yankees would squander the chance to score him. They would also squander many chances in the game to score, as the game moved to extra innings. Jim Thome led off the top of the 12th with a single. Enrique Wilson was then called on to pinch run. Travis Fryman then laid down a sacrifice bunt, and as Jeff Nelson went to throw it to first, he hit Fryman and the ball rolled past Chuck Knoblauch covering. Knoblauch tried to argue the call as the ball continued to roll. Wilson and Fryman continued to run and Wilson would score as the ball was still not dead. An error by Tino Martinez put Fryman at third. The Indians now had the lead back and loaded the bases on a hit-by-pitch and walk. Graeme Lloyd relieved Nelson and allowed a two-run single to Kenny Lofton while Mike Jackson shutout the Yankees in the bottom of the inning for the save as the Indians tied the series 1–1.

Game 3
Friday, October 9, 1998, at Jacobs Field in Cleveland, Ohio

At Jacobs Field for Game 3, the Yankees were rendered helpless by a barrage of Indian home runs and the dazzling pitching of young flamethrower Bartolo Colón. After the Yankees took the lead in the first when Chuck Knoblauch hit a leadoff single, moved to third on two groundouts and scored on a Bernie Williams RBI-single, the Indians took control of the game. Jim Thome led off the bottom of the second with a home run, then Mark Whiten doubled and scored on an Enrique Wilson single to make it 2–1 Cleveland. In the fifth, Manny Ramirez homered with two outs, then after a walk, back-to-back home runs by Thome and Whiten made it 6–1 Indians and knock starter Andy Pettitte out of the game. The strong pitching of Colon silenced the Yankees' bats the rest of the way as the New York batters were held hitless from the fifth inning onwards. Colon would finish with a four-hit complete game victory, and the Indians took a 2–1 edge in the best-of-seven series.

Game 4
Saturday, October 10, 1998, at Jacobs Field in Cleveland, Ohio

The Yankees looked to Orlando "El Duque" Hernández for a clutch pitching performance. Hernandez had come to the Yankees shrouded in mystery, having defected from Cuba just ten months earlier. He was making his postseason debut with this start against former Yankee Dwight Gooden. Paul O'Neill gave Hernandez a run to work with by hitting a home run off Gooden in the top of the first. In the fourth, Gooden walked two before Chili Davis's RBI double and Tino Martinez's sacrifice fly scored a run each. The Yankees added one more run in the ninth on Scott Brosius's sacrifice fly with two on off of Paul Shuey, the run charged to Dave Burba. Hernandez pitched seven shutout innings while Mike Stanton and Mariano Rivera pitched a scoreless eighth and ninth, respectively as the Yankees' 4–0 win tied the series 2–2.

Game 5
Sunday, October 11, 1998, at Jacobs Field in Cleveland, Ohio

Instead of pitching Jaret Wright in Game 5, Indians' manager Mike Hargrove looked to Chad Ogea, who pitched well in the 1997 World Series, to give his team a three games to two lead in the series. The Yankees loaded the bases with one out on a single, walk and hit-by-pitch before Chili Davis's single scored two. Another hit-by-pitch loaded the bases before Tim Raines's RBI groundout made it 3–0 Yankees. A leadoff homer by Kenny Lofton in the bottom of the inning off of David Wells put the Indians on the board. After two singles and a wild pitch put runners on second and third with no outs, a sacrifice fly by Manny Ramírez made it a one-run game. In the second, Chuck Knoblauch drew a leadoff walk, moved to second on a sacrifice bunt, and scored on a Paul O'Neill single to make it 4–2. Chili Davis homered in the fourth off of Wright to put the Yankees ahead by three, but Jim Thome hit his third home run of the series in the bottom of the sixth to make it a two-run game. Wells and the Yankees' bullpen held off any further Indians scoring, and the Yankees were one win away from the World Series.

Game 6
Tuesday, October 13, 1998, at Yankee Stadium (I) in Bronx, New York

In the bottom of the first, three consecutive one out singles off of Charles Nagy by Derek Jeter, Paul O'Neill and Bernie Williams made it 1–0 Yankees, then Chili Davis's RBI groundout made it 2–0. Next inning, Joe Girardi singled with one out and scored on Chuck Knoblauch's double. Next inning, a single and error put two on with no outs and Scott Brosius's home run two outs later made it 6–0. David Cone pitched four shutout innings, but the Indians refused to go quietly. In the fifth, three consecutive singles loaded the bases with no outs, then David Justice walked to force in a run and after Manny Ramirez struck out, a grand slam by Jim Thome made it 6–5. Ramiro Mendoza, then pitched three shutout innings while in the sixth, Derek Jeter's triple with two on off of Dave Burba made it 8–5, then Jeter scored on William's single off of Paul Shuey to make it 9–5 Yankees. Mariano Rivera sealed a World Series berth in the ninth with Omar Vizquel grounding out to end the ALCS, sending the Yankees to their second World Series in three seasons.

Composite box
1998 ALCS (4–2): New York Yankees over Cleveland Indians

Notes

External links
1998 ALCS at Baseball-Reference

American League Championship Series
New York Yankees postseason
Cleveland Indians postseason
American League Championship Series
American League Championship Series
American League Championship Series
1990s in Cleveland
American League Championship Series
1990s in the Bronx